Stef Vandeweyer (born 6 August 1999) is a Belgian snowboarder. He competed in the 2018 Winter Olympics.

References

1999 births
Living people
Snowboarders at the 2018 Winter Olympics
Belgian male snowboarders
Olympic snowboarders of Belgium
Snowboarders at the 2016 Winter Youth Olympics